Patrick Pierre Hernandez (born 6 April 1949) is a French singer who had a worldwide hit with "Born to Be Alive" in 1979.

Biography
Born to a Spanish father and an Italian mother in Le Blanc-Mesnil, Seine-Saint-Denis, Hernandez grew up in the 1960s and was interested in music. He toured dancehalls and ballrooms in southern France with a number of groups over the next decade. Hernández met his music partner Hervé Tholance, an arranger, guitarist, and vocalist, during that period. The two formed a duo and achieved local success backing French musicians such as Francis Cabrel, Laurent Voulzy, and the French group Gold.

In 1978, Hernandez met the producer Jean Vanloo with disco music at its peak, and signed a recording contract. Hernandez went to Waterloo, Belgium to work on songs.

"Born to Be Alive"
After working for about a year, the songs were released on the Aariana sub-label Aquarius Records (in France) in November 1978. The first single that was released was the disco song "Born to Be Alive". Its success was immediate, and in January 1979, Hernandez received his first gold record from Italy. The song spread throughout Europe, where it hit #1 in France in April and remained there until July. By then, the United States had caught on, and after some remixing, the record was signed to the A-Tom-Mik label and later Columbia Records. The remixed version was released on a commercial 12" single; it peaked on the US Billboard disco chart at #1 and crossed over to the Billboard Hot 100 peaking at #16. It sold over one million copies in the US. The track reached #10 in the UK Singles Chart. By year's end, Hernandez had racked up 52 gold and platinum records from more than 50 countries.

After "Born to Be Alive"
While Hernandez was touring the United States, he was accompanied by Vanloo and his friend Jean-Claude Pellerin. Vanloo and Pellerin held auditions in New York that spring for dancers to accompany Hernández on his worldwide tour. The chosen dancers included a young Madonna.

Hernandez's follow-ups to "Born to Be Alive" did not fare as well in the US. "Disco Queen" backed with "Show Me the Way You Kiss" sold poorly, but the album Born to Be Alive sold well and won him a Billboard Award in February 1980. As a result of this lack of subsequent success he has earned the title of "one-hit wonder".

In 1981, Hernandez released the import 12" single of "Goodbye", first released on Aariana Records and then a remixed version on the parent-label Aquarius Records (in France). It was not released in the US, although an album followed the single's release, but found no market in the US.

Discography

Studio albums
 Born to Be Alive (1979)
 Crazy Day's Mystery Night's (1980)
 Good Bye (1981)

Compilation albums
 Born to Be Alive (1990) (released in the US in 1995 as The Best of Patrick Hernandez – Born to Be Alive)
 Best of Patrick Hernandez – Born to Be Alive (1998)

Singles

References

External links

1949 births
Living people
People from Le Blanc-Mesnil
Eurodisco musicians
Columbia Records artists
English-language singers from France
French disco singers
French people of Spanish descent
French people of Austrian descent
French people of Italian descent
20th-century French male singers